Branislav Labant (born 11 May 1976 in Žilina) is a  retired Slovak footballer who last played for FC Nitra in the Slovak Corgoň liga.

Club career
Labant previously played for FK Viktoria Žižkov in the Czech Gambrinus Liga. Prior to that, he had played since his early youth for the Slovak side MŠK Žilina with whom he won three consecutive Slovak Top Division championships.

References

 

1976 births
Living people
Slovak footballers
Slovakia international footballers
FC Nitra players
MŠK Žilina players
Czech First League players
FK Viktoria Žižkov players
Slovak Super Liga players
Sportspeople from Žilina
Association football defenders